Testify is the fifth extended play by The Knocks. It was released on February 3, 2017 through Big Beat and Neon Gold Records. It features vocals from Sam Nelson Harris of X Ambassadors, Absofacto, MNEK, Delacey, Tayla Parx and Jerm.

Background
On January 4, 2017, they released the trailer for their fifth extended play, which was announced under the title Testify. A couple days later, they announced their second single from the EP, entitled "Trouble", featuring Absofacto, which is the solo project of musician Jonathan Visger; currently a member of American rock band Mason Proper. The song itself was released on January 13.

Track listing

References

2017 EPs
The Knocks albums
Albums produced by MNEK
Big Beat Records (American record label) EPs